The Polish Volleyball Federation or in ( Polish : Polski Związek Piłki Siatkowej, PZPS ) is an organization founded in 1928 to govern the practice of Volleyball in Poland.

It organizes all the men's domestic competitions from professional to amateur as well as all women 's domestic championships from First tier to the lowest one, the PZPS Managed and rule over the men's and women's national teams from senior to all age group categories .

PZPS joined the FIVB in 1947.

Provincial Volleyball Associations

Presidents List

References

External links
 Official website PZPS 

Volleyball in Poland
Poland
Volleyball